The Pescăruș oil field is an oil field located on the continental shelf of the Black Sea. It was discovered in 1999 and developed by Petrom. It began production in 2001 and produces oil. The field also produces around 17.9 million cubic feet/day (0.5×105m³) of gas and has reserves of 114 billion cubic feet (3.2×109m³).

References

Black Sea energy
Oil fields in Romania